Meragisa zebrina is a moth of the family Notodontidae. It is found in north-eastern Ecuador.

The length of the forewings is about 21.5 mm. The ground colour of the forewings is silvery white suffused with charcoal-coloured scales. The ground colour of the hindwings is light mustard yellow to buff in the basal one third and grey-brown in the outer two thirds.

Etymology
The species name is derived from the word zebra, the Abyssinian name for the striped equine of Africa and refers to the zebra-like forewing pattern.

References

Moths described in 2011
Notodontidae